The Guangdong Pumped Storage Power Station or Guangzhou Pumped Storage Power Station is a pumped-storage hydroelectric power station near Guangzhou, Guangdong Province, China. The generated power is sold to CLP customers in Hong Kong. The power station was constructed in two stages, the first four turbines were completed in 1994 and the second four in 2000.

Operation
The station is composed mainly of a lower and upper reservoir and an underground power station. Water for the system is derived from the Liuxihe River. Water from the upper reservoir can then be re-released down two penstocks towards the power station. The same reversible pumps that moved the water up can now generate electricity. Just before reaching the power station, the two penstocks each split off into four separate branch pipes, each feeding one of the eight reversible 300 MW turbine generators with water. Once power generation is complete, the generators can reverse, pump the water back up to the upper reservoir and resume the process over again.

See also

 Huizhou Pumped Storage Power Station
 List of power stations in China

References

External links
 Guangdong PPS at China Light & Power

Energy infrastructure completed in 1994
Energy infrastructure completed in 2000
Hydroelectric power stations in Guangdong
Pumped-storage hydroelectric power stations in China
Dams completed in 1994
Roller-compacted concrete dams
Dams in China
1994 establishments in China
Underground power stations